The episodes from the anime television series  are based on the Gin Tama manga by Hideaki Sorachi. The series premiered in TV Tokyo on October 4, 2012. It is a continuation of the second Gintama''' anime that ended in March 2012. The main staff from the second TV series remain in Gintama with Yoichi Fujita as the director. The series continues the story of eccentric samurai, Gintoki Sakata, his apprentice, Shinpachi Shimura, and a teenage alien girl named Kagura and their work as freelancers, who do odd jobs in order to pay the rent, which usually goes unpaid anyway. The episodes were collected in a total of four DVDs from December 19, 2012 to May 22, 2013.Gintama': Enchōsen'' used two openings and two endings. The first opening theme, "LET'S GO OUT" by AMOYAMO is used from episodes 1 to 4, and through the "Gintama Classic" rerun episodes. The second opening theme,  by SPYAIR is used from episodes 5 onward. The first ending theme,  by MONOBRIGHT is used from episodes 1 to 4, and through the "Gintama Classic" rerun episodes. The sixth ending theme,  by PAGE is used from episodes 5 onward.



Episode list

References
General

Specific

' Enchōsen